Lady Juliana Penn (May 21, 1729 – November 20, 1801) was the English wife of Thomas Penn, and she assisted him in the administration of the Colony of Pennsylvania in his later years. She corresponded with John Adams and other leaders of the early United States.

Early life
Lady Juliana was born in 1729, at Easton Neston, Northamptonshire, the fourth daughter of Thomas Fermor, 1st Earl of Pomfret and Henrietta Louisa Jeffreys.

Marriage, family, and colonial relations
Juliana Fermor and Thomas Penn married on August 22, 1751. Lady Juliana was almost thirty years her husband's junior. After their marriage, Thomas Penn (formerly a Quaker) attended Anglican church services regularly, though he did not take part in the sacrament of Communion. The Penns lived at Stoke Park, Buckinghamshire. The Penns had eight children; four of them died in infancy or childhood, and daughter Juliana died in childbirth at age 19.

Thomas Penn experienced declining health in the early 1770s, and as their sons John Penn and Granville Penn were still very young, Lady Juliana took an active role in maintaining the proprietorship of Pennsylvania. She corresponded with Governor John Penn and other colonial officials, including discussing maps and other materials of administration.

In March 1775, Lady Juliana was widowed, and was appointed co-executor of her husband's personal estate.  Soon after, events of the American Revolutionary War complicated her family's fortunes, and she wrote frequently to American leaders such as Henry Laurens and John Adams about "the cause of an Innocent and Suffering Family." Lady Juliana and her co-executor William Baker also took an active interest in the survey of Susquehanna Land Company holdings in the Wyoming Valley, and wrote to James Tilghman expressing their hopes for a favorable outcome. The Reverend Jacob Duché wrote to Benjamin Franklin about visiting "my most Amiable Friend Lady Juliana Penn," during an official trip to England in 1783. John Jay wrote to Lady Juliana from the Treaty of Paris (1783) negotiations, to keep her apprised of their progress.

Lady Juliana Penn died in 1801, aged 72, at Beaufort House, Ham. Her remains were buried with her husband's and with her children's, at Stoke Poges.

Legacy
Lady Juliana sat for three portraits with Sir Joshua Reynolds, in 1755, 1764, and 1767. A 1752 portrait of Lady Juliana by Arthur Devis is held by the Philadelphia Museum of Art.  The Juliana Library Company of Lancaster, Pennsylvania was named in 1763 for Lady Juliana Penn, because she donated books to the subscription library's collections.

A memorial urn to her was created by James Wyatt and commissioned by her son, John Penn. It is located in the Grade I Designated Stoke Poges Memorial Gardens which was part of the Penn estate of Stoke Park, Stoke Poges.

References

1729 births
1801 deaths
18th-century English women
18th-century English people
Daughters of British earls
Juliana
People from West Northamptonshire District
People of Pennsylvania in the American Revolution